Vicente Figueroa (born 22 October 1977) is a Mexican former professional footballer who played as a midfielder who spent three seasons in Major League Soccer.

Club career
In 1997, Figueroa practiced with the San Jose Clash, but was never offered a contract. On August 14, 1997, the Seattle Sounders of the A-League signed Figueroa. In December 1997, Figueroa signed a one-year contract with the Sounders. However, in April 1998, the Clash signed Figueroa as a discovery player after the Sounders released him.  On November 1, 1998, the Clash waived Figueroa and seven other players after a dismal season.  He then signed with the Kansas City Wizards. He spent two seasons in Kansas City, going on loan to MLS Pro 40 for a handful of games during both seasons. In 2001, he moved to the El Paso Patriots of the USL A-League. From 2003 to 2005, Figueroa played for OTW Santa Clara in the Premier Arena Soccer League. In 2005, he had a successful trial with the California Cougars of the second Major Indoor Soccer League. He was the 2005 MISL Rookie of the Year.  In September 2007, Figueroa tore his right anterior cruciate ligament and his right lateral meniscus in a pre-season exhibition game with the Cougars, losing the entire season. In 2008, he moved to the Baltimore Blast of the National Indoor Soccer League. In November 2009, Figueroa returned to the Cougars, now playing in the PASL.  In 2010, he joined Top Notch FC of the PASL.

References

External links
 
 PASL: Vicente Figueroa

1977 births
Living people
Footballers from Guadalajara, Jalisco
Association football midfielders
Mexican footballers
Seattle Sounders (1994–2008) players
San Jose Earthquakes players
MLS Pro-40 players
Sporting Kansas City players
El Paso Patriots players
California Cougars players
Baltimore Blast (2008–2014 MISL) players
A-League (1995–2004) players
Major League Soccer players
Major Indoor Soccer League (2001–2008) players
Major Indoor Soccer League (2008–2014) players
Professional Arena Soccer League players
Mexican expatriate footballers
Expatriate soccer players in the United States
Mexican expatriate sportspeople in the United States
Anaheim Bolts